Serge Thony (known under the stage name D'Chrome Foster) is an American singer and actor.

Life and career 

Serge Thony was born and raised in Flatbush, Brooklyn, son of Caribbean parents. He grew up in a music-loving environment, which drew him to compose his first song at the age of 3. Throughout his teenage years he strove to perfect his musical style, while working as a MC alongside renowned hip hop artists like Immortal Technique or Jin and performing in clubs in the LES, Jersey and Brooklyn. He graduated from State University of New York with a B.A. degree, later attended Rutgers University and achieved the degree of Master in Fine Arts.

D'Chrome Foster has involved himself in the feminist cause and has expressed disapproval for the fact in the hip hop culture women are objectified and denied liberties and positive image awarded to men. The #LoveMyBounce campaign was created and launched in honor of 2015 International Women's Day by STK MKT Entertainment and D'Chrome Foster to raise awareness of gender inequality, starting with violence against women, to erase the social stigma of identifying as a survivor of abuse, and to be a platform by which there can be elevated organizations that are dedicated to the cause.

Discography 

D'Chrome Foster released in August 2014 his first single, "Manhood", a track that showcases the struggles between a man and his woman. Following the release of "Manhood", D’Chrome released "Cyanide" in December 2014. Both tracks and their accompanying videos tell varied and compelling stories of today’s social issues and touch the issue of pop culture's fascination with a woman’s body image. In January 2015, he followed with another single and the accompanying video, "January", inspired by club music style. He also released the single "Race" in July 2015.

Filmography

Stage credits

References 

American hip hop singers
Rappers from Brooklyn
People from Flatbush, Brooklyn
1977 births
Living people
Male actors from New York City
21st-century American rappers